Francisco Chimoio, O.F.M. Cap. (born 6 December 1947), is a Mozambican Roman Catholic bishop. He has been the Roman Catholic archbishop of Maputo, Mozambique, since 2003.

Life
Chimoio was born in Búzi-Sofala, Mozambique. He was ordained a Roman Catholic priest on 9 December 1979.  Pope John Paul II appointed him to the position of bishop of Pemba on 5 December 2000. The bishop's consecration took place on 25 February 2001. On 22 February 2003, John Paul II elevated him to the position of archbishop of Maputo; he is the head of the catholic church in Mozambique.

HIV claims
In 2007, Chimoio he was quoted as having said that some condoms and anti-retroviral medication made in Europe have been deliberately infected with HIV "in order to finish quickly the African people". He later explained that he had been misinterpreted.

References

External links 
Francisco Chimoio page at Catholic Hierarchy

Living people
1947 births
People from Sofala Province
21st-century Roman Catholic archbishops in Mozambique
Capuchin bishops
Roman Catholic archbishops of Maputo
Roman Catholic bishops of Pemba